"Yankee Doodle Doctor" is an episode of the television series M*A*S*H. It was the sixth episode broadcast and aired on October 22, 1972, and it was rerun April 8, 1973. It was written by Laurence Marks and directed by Lee Philips.

Guest cast is Ed Flanders as Lt. Bricker, Bert Kramer as Sgt. Martin, Tom Sparks as Corpsman, Marcia Strassman as Nurse Margie Cutler and Herb Voland as Brig. Gen. Crandell Clayton.

Overview 
Lieutenant Bricker is making a documentary about Mobile Army Surgical Hospital (MASH) units and General Clayton recommends the 4077th. However, when Hawkeye and Trapper discover the "documentary" is little more than Army propaganda, they destroy it and make their own version. 

Bricker wants one of the doctors to "star" in his documentary and Hawkeye Pierce agrees when faced with the possibility that the role could go to Frank Burns. The documentary is nothing more than turgid propaganda. In the night, Pierce and McIntyre destroy the film by exposing it to light. They persuade Blake to let them make their own film and turn it into a comedy, casting Hawkeye as a Groucho Marx-type doctor, Trapper as a Harpo Marx-esque surgeon, and Radar as their hapless patient. The final scene is a somber monologue by Hawkeye about the grim realities of war, delivered at the bedside of a patient in the post-op ward.

Blake is mortified and Clayton is unimpressed at first, while the rest of the crowd loves the film. Afterward, Clayton tells Blake to destroy it but save one copy for him, so that he can have something to laugh at once the war is over, and he will also use the final scene in his own documentary.

Themes and reception
This is one of the first episodes of M*A*S*H to deal strongly with anti-war themes.  In April 1973, this episode was cited by Newsweek as an example of "irony at its most abrasive".

This is the first episode Frank Burns shares a tent with Trapper and Pierce, an unexplained replacement for Spearchucker Jones.

References

External links
 

1972 American television episodes
M*A*S*H (season 1) episodes
Cultural depictions of the Marx Brothers